Ranbir Singh Suri, Baron Suri (born 10 February 1935) is a Conservative life peer in the United Kingdom's House of Lords, nominated in 2014. He is a businessman and formerly the general secretary of the Board of British Sikhs. He was made a Life Peer by Queen Elizabeth II on 15 September 2014, as the Baron Suri, of Ealing in the London Borough of Ealing.

Political donations

Suri donated £300,000 to the Conservative Party between 2004 and 2014.

References

Living people
British businesspeople
Conservative Party (UK) life peers
British politicians of Indian descent
1935 births
Life peers created by Elizabeth II